Vadym Vasylyovych Hudzinskyi (born 2 July 2001) is a Ukrainian professional footballer who plays as a central midfielder for Ukrainian club Ahrobiznes Volochysk.

References

External links
 Profile on Ahrobiznes Volochysk official website
 

2001 births
Living people
Ukrainian footballers
Association football midfielders
FC Karpaty Lviv players
FC Ahrobiznes Volochysk players
Ukrainian First League players
Ukrainian Second League players
Sportspeople from Lviv Oblast